James Green (1836–1905) was a 19th-century independent Member of Parliament in Otago, New Zealand.

References

1836 births
1905 deaths
Members of the New Zealand House of Representatives
Independent MPs of New Zealand
New Zealand MPs for Dunedin electorates
Unsuccessful candidates in the 1879 New Zealand general election
Unsuccessful candidates in the 1884 New Zealand general election
Unsuccessful candidates in the 1896 New Zealand general election
Unsuccessful candidates in the 1887 New Zealand general election
19th-century New Zealand politicians